Spice World may refer to:

 Spiceworld (album), a 1997 album by the Spice Girls
 Spiceworld Tour, a 1998 concert tour by the Spice Girls
 Spice World – 2019 Tour, a 2019 concert tour by the Spice Girls
 Spice World (film), a 1997 British musical comedy film starring the Spice Girls
 Spice World (video game), a video game based on the film
 SpiceWorld, the Spiceworks annual user conference

See also

 Spice Planet, an alternate Dune story written by Brian Herbert and Kevin J. Anderson